Bonnie Tyler Live (also known as Live) is the first live CD released by Welsh singer Bonnie Tyler. It was released as a disc which accompanied the release of Bonnie on Tour; a DVD that promoted the release of Tyler's 2005 album Wings. The tracks featured on the album were recorded in La Cigale in Paris and Zaragoza in Spain.

Track listing
Thirteen of the sixteen tracks were recorded at La Cigale for Tyler's birthday in 2005.

 Tracks 1 and 10 are instrumental performances of "Holding Out for a Hero" for the opening of the concert and the interlude.
 The Normandy Highland Pipe Band played the bagpipes for track 6.
 Tracks 12, 14 and 15 were performed in Spain.

References

Bonnie Tyler live albums
2006 live albums